Oracle Developer Suite is a suite of development tools released by the Oracle Corporation. The principal components were initially Oracle Forms and Oracle Reports and the suite was later expanded to include Oracle Designer and JDeveloper amongst others.

History

When the Oracle Relational Database Management System hit the market in 1986  the first commercially available version was version 4  it comprised already SQL*Forms, which was one of the first Fourth Generation Language (4GL) products marketed as such. In the early 1990s, Oracle then had two complementary tools - SQL*Forms and SQL*ReportWriter.
SQL*Forms was used to develop data entry systems
SQL*ReportWriter was used to developer reports
Both tools were character-based and there was some integration between the two although they were sold as separate products.  The developer interface became more similar over time and they were eventually bundled together as a single product named Oracle CDE (Cooperative Development Environment).

The suite was later renamed to Oracle Developer and later Developer/2000

As with most products that had 2000 in their name, this was dropped after 1999 and the suite was renamed Oracle Developer Suite.  Tools such as JDeveloper were added over subsequent years.

Most of the component parts of Oracle Developer Suite are now part of what Oracle calls Oracle Fusion Middleware.

Components

The name of the suite has been changed a few times.
The software components that are included in the suite have also been renamed over time.

Current status

The latest release, Oracle Developer Suite 10g consists of the following components:

 Oracle JDeveloper
 Oracle Forms
 Oracle Reports
 Oracle Designer
 Oracle Discoverer
 Oracle Software Configuration Manager
 Oracle Business Intelligence Beans

Oracle Technet download page for 10g says it is no longer supported (updated 5 September 2018) and no newer versions exist.

External links
 Official Oracle Page

Oracle software